Alma-Sofia Miettinen (born 17 January 1996), known professionally as Alma (stylised in all caps), is a Finnish singer and songwriter. Beginning her career in 2013, she placed fifth in the seventh season of the Finnish version of Idol. Her breakthrough came in 2015 when she was featured on the single "Muuta ku mä" by Sini Sabotage, and was subsequently signed to Universal Music Group.

The following year she released the singles "Karma" and "Dye My Hair", both of which became top ten hits in Finland. Her 2017 single "Chasing Highs" repeated this success, and also reached the top twenty in Germany and the United Kingdom. Her extended play Heavy Rules Mixtape was released in 2018 and reached the top ten in Finland. She has collaborated frequently with English singer Charli XCX, Swedish singer Tove Lo, English DJ Digital Farm Animals who produced most of the songs of her debut album and most recently, American singer Miley Cyrus.

Career

Idols 
In 2013, at age 17, Alma auditioned for the seventh season of Finnish Idols. She progressed to the live shows, where she finished fifth.

Dye My Hair 
In 2015, she was featured on Sini Sabotage's single "Muuta ku mä". In March 2016, Alma was signed to Universal Music, and in June she released her first single "Karma". The song peaked at number 5 on the Finnish Singles Chart. She is also the featured vocalist on the Felix Jaehn song "Bonfire". The song was released as a single in July 2016. In September 2016, Alma was confirmed to play at the 31st edition of Eurosonic Noorderslag in Groningen, NL. On 28 October 2016, she released her debut EP Dye My Hair.

She released the single "Chasing Highs" in March 2017. The song peaked at number 10 on the Finnish Singles Chart. In June it was released in the UK, and became Alma's first UK top 20 hit. She was featured on the Sub Focus' song "Don't You Feel It", released as a single in May 2017. She was also the featured vocalist on Martin Solveig's song "All Stars" which was released as a single in June 2017.

Personal life 
In a March 2019 article in Gay Times, Alma confirmed she is lesbian and in a relationship. Her partner is the Finnish poet and civil rights activist Natalia Kallio.

Discography

Albums

Extended plays

Singles

As lead artist

As featured artist

Other charted songs

Guest appearances

Music videos

Songwriting credits 
 indicates un-credited lead vocal contribution. indicates single release

Filmography

Awards and nominations

Tours

Headlining 
Minitour Europe (2016)

E.U.R.O Tour (2018)

Have U Seen Her Tour (2019)

Europe Tour (2022)

Support 
MØ – Forever Neverland World Tour (2018)

Christina Aguilera – The X Tour (2019)

Tove Lo – Sunshine Kitty Tour (2020)

Notes

References

External links 
 Facebook

Living people
1996 births
Finnish LGBT singers
Finnish LGBT songwriters
Lesbian songwriters
Finnish women songwriters
21st-century Finnish women singers
Finnish pop singers
Universal Music Group artists
Warner Records artists
Virgin Records artists
Epic Records artists
RCA Records artists
Lesbian singers
Finnish pop musicians
20th-century Finnish LGBT people
21st-century Finnish LGBT people